The line of thrust is the locus of the points, through which forces pass in a retaining wall or an arch. It is the line, along which internal forces flow, .

In a stone structure, the line of thrust is a theoretical line that through the structure represents the path of the resultants of the compressive forces, . For a structure to be stable, the line of thrust must lie entirely inside the structure, .

Where important

The line of thrust is important in almost any architecture bearing weight. This includes aircraft, bridges, plus arches; see catenary arch.

An arch won't collapse, when the line of thrust is entirely internal to the arch, .

See also
 Damage tolerance
 Force lines
 Strength of materials
 Stress concentration
 Structural fracture mechanics
 Stress intensity factor
 Stress–strain analysis

External links

 One largish article, talks about line of thrust
 A definition
 Another definition
 A second reference
 A third reference

Mechanics
Construction